Valentina Fernanda Díaz Tapia (born 30 March 2001) is a Chilean footballer who plays as a defender for Universidad de Chile and the Chile women's national team.

International career
Díaz made her senior debut for Chile on 3 March 2019 in a 2–3 friendly loss against Jamaica.

Statistics

References 

2001 births
Living people
Chilean women's footballers
Women's association football defenders
Colo-Colo (women) footballers
Chile women's international footballers
2019 FIFA Women's World Cup players
Footballers at the 2020 Summer Olympics
Olympic footballers of Chile
Universidad de Chile footballers